Brīvā Daugava is a regional newspaper published in Latvia.

References

Newspapers published in Latvia